A list of organizations established by or closely associated with the Nazi Party, sortable by their German or English title.

Nazi Party organizations